Open Plaza Los jardines is a shopping center of 25,000 m²  located in the Peruvian city of Trujillo, in the locality called Los Jardines, east of the Historic Centre of Trujillo. It belongs to Malls Peru is owned business unit of Falabella Perú. This mall, called format Power Center by the same company, is characterized by at least four local anchor present here as Sodimac and Tottus hypermarkets, smaller operators are also present around anchor stores such as Do it, Coolbox, Boticas BTL, Topitop, etc. and a food court and a Financial Boulevard. This mall was built on what was the former Los Jardines Hotel and it opened on December 3, 2008 with an investment of 26 million dollars. Open Plaza Los Jardines is the 5th  mall that Malls Peru company has constructed in the country.

Stores
Tottus
Sodimac
Do it
Login Store
Coolbox
Ópticas GMO
Econolentes
Topitop
Boticas BTL
Coney Park
Glifter

Related companies
Mall Aventura Plaza Trujillo
Real Plaza Trujillo

See also

Historic Centre of Trujillo
Chan Chan
Huanchaco
Puerto Chicama
Chimu
Pacasmayo beach
Plaza de Armas of Trujillo
Moche
Víctor Larco Herrera District
Vista Alegre
Buenos Aires
Las Delicias beach
Independence of Trujillo
Wall of Trujillo
Santiago de Huamán
Lake Conache
Marinera Festival
Trujillo Spring Festival
Wetlands of Huanchaco
Association of Breeders and Owners of Paso Horses in La Libertad
Salaverry beach
Puerto Morín
Virú culture
Marcahuamachuco
Wiracochapampa

External links
Location of Open Plaza Los Jardines in Trujillo (Wikimapia)
"Huaca de la luna and Huaca del sol"
"Huacas del Sol y de la Luna Archaeological Complex", Official Website
Information on El Brujo Archaeological Complex
Chan Chan World Heritage Site, UNESCO
Chan Chan conservation project
Website about Trujillo, Reviews, Events, Business Directory
Municipality of Trujillo

Multimedia
 
 
 
 Gallery pictures of Trujillo by Panoramio, Includes Geographical information by various authors
 Colonial Trujillo photos

References

Malls in Trujillo, Peru